= Infielder =

Defensive position in baseball

An infielder is a baseball player stationed at one of four defensive "infield" positions on the baseball field, between first base and third base.

== Standard arrangement of positions ==
In a game of baseball, two teams of nine players take turns playing offensive and defensive roles. Although there are many rules to baseball, in general the team playing offense tries to score runs by batting balls into the field that enable runners to make a complete circuit of the four bases. The team playing in the field tries to prevent runs by catching the ball before it hits the ground, by tagging runners with the ball while they are not touching a base, or by throwing the ball to first base before the batter who hit the ball can run from home plate to first base.

There are nine defensive positions on a baseball field. The part of the baseball field closest to the batter (shown in the diagram as light brown) is known as the "infield" (as opposed to the "outfield", the part of the field furthest from the batter, shown in the diagram as green.)

== Positions ==
The infield is composed of four positions: first base (1B), second base (2B), third base (3B) and shortstop (SS). Generally, the first three have responsibility for plays at their respective bases, although the shortstop often shares responsibility for second base with the second baseman. Each position requires a different set of skills. A player who lacks the offensive or defensive skills needed to be a member of the starting lineup, but who has the various skills needed to play two or more infield positions competently and therefore can be called upon to come off the bench and fill a variety of defensive roles is called a utility infielder.

== Roles ==
=== Middle infielders ===
The second baseman and the shortstop are the middle infielders. The second baseman tries to field balls hit between first and second base. The shortstop does the same between second and third base. Once fielded, the balls must be thrown to the first baseman before the batter can reach first base. This requires speed to get to hit balls before they pass beyond reach, dexterity to successfully field the balls, and agility to field the balls in a position that will allow a strong throw to first base. Second basemen and shortstops also share responsibility for tagging runners who are attempting to steal second base. Because a shortstop has a longer throw to make to first base, he must reach the ball faster and throw harder than the second baseman. For this reason, the shortstop must have the best fielding skills of any infielder. Because of the spectrum of skills required by a middle infielder, emphasis is usually put on defensive skills rather than offensive ability—good defensive skills and a mediocre bat are often considered more important than a good bat and poor defensive skills.

=== Corner infielders ===
The first baseman and the third baseman are the corner infielders.

The third baseman primarily fields balls hit and bunted down the third base line, but can also attempt to reach balls hit between second and third base. Although the third baseman does not need to cover as great a range as the shortstop or second baseman, the position requires greater anticipation and quicker reflexes, since the third baseman may be standing only 90 feet from the batter and sometimes much less; thus, he has much less time to react to hit balls than the shortstop or second baseman. The third baseman must also have a strong arm since the throw from his position to first base is the longest on the infield.

The first baseman is largely responsible for keeping one foot on first base while catching throws from the other three infielders before the batter can reach first base. These throws are often hurried and thus off-target. A player who is tall and has long arms may be a good candidate for first baseman because these attributes help him handle off-target throws. The first baseman must be able to cleanly field thrown balls that hit the ground before they reach first base, and to quickly decide to abandon first when necessary to catch an especially bad throw. Since the first baseman mostly stands close to his base, his mobility and throwing skills do not need to be high; good hitters who are slow of foot are often placed at first base. In some cases, an aging third baseman or outfielder who has lost some speed but is still a good hitter will be moved to first base to keep his bat in the line-up.
